Plectropoda cruciata is a species of squash bugs belonging to the family Coreidae.

Distribution
This species can be found in the rainforest of Cameroon and Republic of the Congo.

References

External links
Image at Alamy

Mictini
Insects of Cameroon
Insects of the Republic of the Congo
Insects described in 1852